Amlan National High School is a public secondary school in Amlan, Negros Oriental, Philippines.

History
Amlan National High School was established on the opening of the school year 1972-1973 through the efforts of Mayor David Trasmonte and District Supervisor Jose Galvez.  This was initiated in response to the townpeople's request for a high school in the municipality since students who aspired for secondary education would have to go to Tanjay and Dumaguete city.

The school was led by Maria Theresa S. Villanueva from 1972 until 1974. Classes were held in the Amlan Central Elementary School for a few years because there was still no lot for the high school.

School principals
TICs have been:
  Francisco Ortega, 1975-1976 
 Celedoña Zoza Notarte, 1976-1981 (became principal in July 1981) 
 Julian Tornandizo,
 Fidelita Sienes
 Rosela Rodriguez Abiera was assigned in ANHS in January 2003 up to the present

High schools in Negros Oriental
Educational institutions established in 1972
1972 establishments in the Philippines